Levinskaya is a rural locality (a village) in Nizhneslobodskoye Rural Settlement, Vozhegodsky District, Vologda Oblast, Russia. The population was 1 as of 2002.

Geography 
The distance to Vozhega is 59 km, to Derevenka is 10 km. Blinovskaya, Nekrasovskaya, Lukyanovskaya are the nearest rural localities.

References 

Rural localities in Vozhegodsky District